Eastern Suburbs (now known as the Sydney Roosters) competed in their 54th New South Wales Rugby League season in 1961 finishing the season in 5th position.

Details

The Eastern Suburbs line-up for the 1961 season was:
• John Andrew
• Ken Ashcroft
• Boyce Beeton
• P. Dickenson
• Terry Fearnley
• Don Fenton
• Peter Gallagher
• Jack Gibson
• Ron Hanson
• Ron Keyes

1961 NSWRL ladder

1961 Premiership Results

 Round 1 - Sunday, 16 April 1961.
Eastern Suburbs 25 defeated South Sydney 11(W. Stokes Try; R. Taylor 4 Goals) played at the Sydney Cricket Ground

 Round 2 - Sunday, 23 April 1961.
Eastern Suburbs 34 defeated North Sydney 21(M. Maher, P. Cuneo, Irvine Tries; Carlson 6 Goals) played at the Sydney Sports Ground.

References 

Sydney Roosters seasons
Eastern Suburbs season
East